Clara Luciani (born 10 July 1992) is a French musician.

Biography
Luciani comes from a Corsican family. Her grandfather, whom she did not know, was from Ajaccio. Luciani grew up in Septèmes-les-Vallons, in the suburbs of Marseille. Before her career in music, she studied art history and performed various jobs, including pizza chef, babysitter, sales at Zara, and teaching ESL.

In 2011, she met the band La Femme, where she became, for a time, one of the vocalists. She sang two songs on the album Psycho Tropical Berlin, released in 2013. After leaving the band, she formed the duo Hologram with Maxime Sokolinski.

In 2015–2016, Luciani accompanied singer Raphaël onstage for his Somnambules tour.

In 2017, she performed with Benjamin Biolay and released her first EP, Monstre d'amour, recorded with Benjamin Lebeau (The Shoes) and Ambroise Willaume (Revolver), to critical acclaim.

On 6 April 2018, Luciani released her first studio album, Sainte-Victoire, which was well received by the press. The following winter, she toured Australia, performing at the So Frenchy So Chic festival series in Adelaide, Melbourne, Sydney, and Brisbane. She released a second album, Cœur, in 2021.

Luciani claims Françoise Hardy, Serge Gainsbourg, Nico, Michel Legrand, and Paul McCartney as influences.

Discography

Studio albums

EPs

Singles

As lead artist

As featured artist

Other charted songs

References

External links
 

1992 births
Living people
People from Martigues
French singer-songwriters
French women singers
French people of Corsican descent